Charlie MacGregor is a Scottish entrepreneur, CEO and founder of Netherlands-headquartered hybrid hospitality investor, developer and operator The Student Hotel, and co-founder of NGO Movement on the Ground.  

Charlie started his career at the age of 16 working on building sites, and since then has developed into a strong business professional. Charlie followed the footsteps of his father who built the first-ever student housing building in 1980 for the University of Edinburgh. In his first foray as a property entrepreneur, he purchased a small student accommodation company at the age of 25, which he sold 10 years later. After spending time in London, MacGregor relocated to Amsterdam in 2003 where he established The Student Hotel in 2006.

Under MacGregor’s leadership, TSH has been acknowledged by Deloitte as one of 51 best managed companies in the Netherlands 2017-18. As founder and CEO of this innovative concept, MacGregor has reimagined the concept of ‘hybrid’ city centre accommodation for an expanding customer base of internationally-minded students, entrepreneurs and travellers.

Beyond TSH, Charlie focuses on his work improving refugee camps through the humanitarian crises NGO he founded in 2015, Movement on the Ground (MOTG). MOTG recently began supporting refugees from Ukraine on the ground in Poland.

Charlie is a frequent speaker at events such as OnBrand and Real Asset Live.

The Student Hotel (TSH) 
MacGregor founded The Student Hotel in 2006, a hybrid hospitality concept combining student accommodation, hotel, extended stay rooms, co-working facilities, meeting and event spaces, restaurant and bars, all under one community, one roof.

With their hybrid hospitality model, TSH accommodates students, young professionals, leisure, business guests, and more. As of 2022, TSH has 15 locations including Amsterdam, Berlin, Paris, Florence, and Barcelona. TSH expects to open another 10 hotels across Europe by 2025, increasing its operation to 25 hotels. In 2022, it will open hotels in Madrid, Barcelona and Toulouse.

The Student Hotel has raised investments including €150 million (£118m) from Perella Weinberg Real Estate in 2014 and €100 million from APG in 2015. In 2019, the company secured a €82 million green finance package from Credit Agricole for development of its location in Paris and refurbishment of its Toulouse location. In 2021, the company announced a €300 million funding from investors Aermont and APG, allowing it to start the construction of seven new hotels in key European cities. In 2022, TSH has received a €145 million social and environmental impact financing from Italian bank Unicredit for the development of its Rome and second Florence locations, planning to open in 2024.

In alignment with their sustainability journey, TSH has achieved BREEAM In-Use sustainability certification for seven of its eight Dutch properties. The Building Research Establishment Environmental Assessment Method is a certification used to measure the sustainable built environment, assessed on land use and ecology, pollution and emissions, water and energy sourcing and usage, and quality of internal environments ensuring improved health and well-being. For example, all Netherlands locations received a rating between ‘Very Good’ to ‘Excellent’.  All new TSH properties are certified with the ‘Very Good’ rating being the minimum.

Movement on the Ground 
MacGregor is also a co-founder and member of Movement on the Ground, a non-profit foundation responding to the global refugee crisis.

After visiting Lesvos, Greece, in 2015, MacGregor came up with the idea for The Movement Hotel: a temporary hotel run by asylum seekers, as a way for them to gain experience, with profits reinvested to train more refugees.

The hotel was located in Bijlmerbajes prison, a former prison in Amsterdam, and opened in September 2017. In the same building other successful initiatives took place. Refugee Company foundation opened restaurant A Beautiful Mess, which won Entree Awards’ Best off the Grid Award in 2017.

Tuscany Business Advisor 
MacGregor is one of the Tuscany Business Advisors, the business leaders who work with the regional government to help secure inward investment to Tuscany 

Living people
Year of birth missing (living people)